The Target is a 2014 South Korean action thriller film starring Ryu Seung-ryong, Lee Jin-wook, Yoo Jun-sang and Kim Sung-ryung, and directed by Yoon Hong-seung (who also goes by the pseudonym Chang). It is a remake of the 2010 French film Point Blank.

Released on April 30, 2014 in South Korea, the film was also shown out of competition in the Midnight Screenings section at the 2014 Cannes Film Festival.

Plot
Former mercenary Yeo-hoon has reformed and is leading a normal life. That is, until he winds up framed for the death of a prominent CEO. He escapes, takes a bullet and winds up in a hospital bed. A doctor at the hospital, medical resident Tae-joon, helps him to escape his pursuers. When Tae-joon's pregnant wife is kidnapped, the two men embark on a dangerous 36-hour chase.

Cast

 Ryu Seung-ryong as Baek Yeo-hoon
 Lee Jin-wook as Lee Tae-joon
 Yoo Jun-sang as Song Gi-cheol
 Kim Sung-ryung as Jung Young-joo
 Jo Yeo-jeong as Jung Hee-joo
 Jo Eun-ji as Park Soo-jin
 Jin Goo as Baek Sung-hoon
 Kim Dae-myung as Jang Gyu-ho 
 Jang Joon-nyeong as Lee Jeong-soo 
 Yeom Ji-yeong as Yoo Hyeon-young 
 Lee Hyun-wook as Jo Sang-woo 
 Jo Kyeong-hoon as Jang Pil-joo 
 Kim Tae-hwan as Killer 1 
 Ki Se-hyeong as Killer 2 
 Joo Seok-je as Jang Jin-seong 
 Kim Jong-gu as Chief of police
 Byun Sang-yoon as Yeong-joo team member
 Yoo Yeong-bok as Yang Dong-seok 
 Wi Yang-ho as Arch king 
 Jang Eun-seon as Ob/gyn female doctor
 Shin Dam-soo as Drunk 
 Kim Young-jae as Prosecutor

Box office
The Target was released on April 30, 2014. It had a solid opening despite placing third at the box office, behind The Fatal Encounter (another Korean film released on the same day) and The Amazing Spider-Man 2.

On its second week, the film rose to second place at the box office, for a total of more than 2 million admissions from 716 screens nationwide.

References

External links
  
 
 
 

2014 films
2014 action thriller films
2010s pregnancy films
South Korean action thriller films
2010s Korean-language films
CJ Entertainment films
Films directed by Chang
South Korean remakes of foreign films
Remakes of French films
Films about kidnapping
2010s South Korean films